= Philip Ney =

Philip Gordon Ney (born in 1935) was a Canadian pro-life psychiatrist, clinical psychologist and psychotherapist. Ney ran for public office several times, including 2 terms as a Victoria School Board Trustee.

== Biography ==
He was a professor of University of British Columbia. He had taught at University of Calgary, University of Montreal, University of Hong Kong and University of Otago. Founder and director of International Institute for Pregnancy Loss and Child Abuse Research and Recovery (IIPLCARR) and International Hope Alive Counselors Association (IHACA).

== Selected books ==
- Ending the Cycle of Abuse: The Stories of Women Abused as Children and the Group Therapy Techniques That Helped Them Heal (1994) Brunner/Mazel, Inc. ISBN 0-87630-752-7
- Deeply Damaged (1997) Pioneer Publishing. ISBN 0-920952-10-0
- Abortion Survivors (1998) Pioneer Publishing. ISBN 0-920952-11-9
- Hope Alive: Post Abortion and Abuse Treatment, a Guide for Group Counselling (1998) Pioneer Publishing.

== Legal troubles ==
Dr. Philip Ney was charged with animal cruelty following the death of his 6-year-old mix-breed dog “Star” but the charges were stayed on May 9, 2018.
